Stefan Niementowski (August 4, 1866 – July 13, 1925 was a Polish chemist. He discovered the Niementowski quinoline synthesis and the Niementowski quinazoline synthesis. He was a president of Polish Copernicus Society of Naturalists (1920–22).

References

External links 

 Polish Chemistry

1866 births
1925 deaths
Polish chemists
Lviv Polytechnic rectors